Peter John Drinnen (born 5 October 1967) is a former Australian cricketer who played at first-class level for Queensland. He later coached Scotland and the Netherlands at international level. He is currently head coach of Brisbane's Valley District Cricket Club.

Biography
From Bundaberg, Queensland, Drinnen represented the state at under-19 level, and also played several matches for a Queensland Country side in the National Country Cricket Championships. A wicket-keeper, he debuted for Queensland during the 1988–89 season, playing two limited-overs matches in two days against the touring Pakistanis, both at Mackay's Ray Mitchell Oval. In the first-class Sheffield Shield, he played three matches in the middle of season, with Queensland's usual wicket-keeper, Ian Healy, having been called up to play for the national side. On debut against South Australia, he recorded what was to be his highest first-class score, scoring 74 runs and featuring in a 124-run partnership for the seventh wicket with captain Greg Ritchie. Competing with Peter Anderson for the keeper's spot in the absence of Healy, Drinnen played only two Shield matches the following season, with his last match for Queensland coming in March 1990, in the semi-final of the limited-overs FAI Cup.

With his career in Australia limited by injury, Drinnen played a number of seasons as a professional for Forfarshire in the Scottish National Cricket League (SNCL), and later coached the team. In December 2003, he was appointed technical director of the Scottish Cricket Union (SCU), the governing body of the sport in Scotland. Drinnen served in this position until January 2006, when he succeeded Andy Moles as coach of the Scottish national side. He coached Scotland at the 2007 World Cup, with the team winless at the tournament. Drinnen resigned from the role in July 2007, having supposedly been unpopular among some members of the squad. He returned to his previous role as technical director, while Andy Tennant and Peter Steindl took over the squad on an interim basis, with Steindl taking on the position permanently from December 2007. Drinnen was named coach of the Netherlands in January 2008, replacing previous senior coach Peter Cantrell and taking over from acting coach Paul-Jan Bakker. He remained in the position until his resignation in October 2013, having coached the side at the 2009 and 2012 World Twenty20s, and the 2011 World Cup.

See also
 List of coaches of the Dutch national cricket team
 List of coaches of the Scottish national cricket team

References

1967 births
Australian cricket coaches
Australian cricketers
Coaches of the Netherlands national cricket team
Coaches of the Scotland national cricket team
Cricketers from Queensland
Living people
Sportspeople from Bundaberg
Queensland cricketers
Wicket-keepers
Australian expatriates in the Netherlands
Australian expatriates in Scotland